The following list of painters by name includes about 3,400 painters from all ages and parts of the world.

See also

Lists of painters
Lists of painters by nationality
List of modern artists
List of contemporary artists
List of 20th-century women artists
List of 21st-century women artists
List of sculptors
List of architects
List of graphic designers
List of illustrators